Eleanore Bäumel (21 February 1918 – 24 July 2006) was an Austrian figure skater. She competed in the pairs event at the 1936 Winter Olympics.

References

External links
 

1918 births
2006 deaths
Austrian female pair skaters
Olympic figure skaters of Austria
Figure skaters at the 1936 Winter Olympics
Place of birth missing